The Washington Township School District is a community public school district that serves students in pre-kindergarten through sixth grade from Washington Township, in Warren County, New Jersey, United States.

As of the 2018–19 school year, the district, comprised of two schools, had an enrollment of 422 students and 46.0 classroom teachers (on an FTE basis), for a student–teacher ratio of 9.2:1.

The district is classified by the New Jersey Department of Education as being in District Factor Group "GH", the third-highest of eight groupings. District Factor Groups organize districts statewide to allow comparison by common socioeconomic characteristics of the local districts. From lowest socioeconomic status to highest, the categories are A, B, CD, DE, FG, GH, I and J.

Public school students in seventh through twelfth grades attend the schools of the Warren Hills Regional School District, which also serves students from the municipalities of Franklin Township, Mansfield Township and Washington Borough, along with those from Oxford Township who attend for grades 9-12 only. Schools in the district (with 2018–19 enrollment data from the National Center for Education Statistics) are 
Warren Hills Regional Middle School located in Washington Borough with 542 students in grades 7-8 and 
Warren Hills Regional High School located in Washington Township with 1,205 students in grades 9-12.

Schools
Schools in the district (with 2018–19 enrollment data from the National Center for Education Statistics) are:
Port Colden School with 163 students in grades 1-3
Michael Neu, Principal
Brass Castle School with 258 students in pre-kindergarten, kindergarten and grades 4-6
Jessica L. Garcia, Principal

Administration
Core members of the district's administration are:
Keith Neuhs, Superintendent
Jean Flynn, Business Administrator / Board Secretary

Board of education
The district's board of education, comprised of seven members, sets policy and oversees the fiscal and educational operation of the district through its administration. As a Type II school district, the board's trustees are elected directly by voters to serve three-year terms of office on a staggered basis, with either two or three seats up for election each year held (since 2012) as part of the November general election. The board appoints a superintendent to oversee the district's day-to-day operations and a business administrator to supervise the business functions of the district.

References

External links
Washington Township School District
 
School Data for the Washington Township School District, National Center for Education Statistics
Warren Hills Regional School District

Washington Township, Warren County, New Jersey
New Jersey District Factor Group GH
School districts in Warren County, New Jersey